The Grove is a heritage listed building of historical significance located south of Narberth, Pembrokeshire. It was built by Daniel Poyer in about 1680 shortly after he inherited the property from his father. The house remained in the Poyer family for the next two centuries. Today the Grove is a hotel and restaurant. It caters for special events particularly weddings.

The Poyer family

Daniel Poyer a local gentleman built the Grove in the 1680s. He inherited the property from his father Henry Poyer when he died in 1677. In 1686 Daniel married Priscilla Allen daughter of William Allen of Gellysweeke, parish of Hubberston. It is therefore likely that he erected his new house at about this time. He died in 1703 and the property was passed to his eldest son. Daniel's Will which is shown reveals that he had five children – three sons and two daughters. The property remained in the Poyer family until it was inherited by John Poyer who died in 1787. It was then passed to his sister Anne who married William Callen thereby bringing the house into the Callen family.

The Callen family
Anne Callen retained ownership of the Grove throughout her life and when she died in 1808 she left it to her eldest son John Callen. He lived at the Grove for about fifteen years but appears to have remained unmarried. He died intestate in 1823 and his younger brother Charles Callen was granted his estates as the next of kin.

Charles Callen died in 1825 leaving his property to his wife Eliza (née Davies) She lived at the Grove and when she died in 1840 she left the house to her eldest son Charles Poyer Callen.

Charles Poyer Callen was born in 1797 In 1822 he married Anne Mansel but the couple appear to have had no children so when he made his Will in 1848 he left all of his estates to her. He died in 1854 and as she had predeceased him they were granted successively to his nephews. The first nephew to inherit was John Poyer Hugh Charles Callen (1836-1866) who was the son of Charles's brother Daniel Poyer Callen. He was a Captain of the 71st Highlanders but he did not marry and so when he died in 1866 the Grove was inherited by Charles's other nephew John Lennox Griffith Poyer Lewis. The house was then brought over to the Lewis family.

The Lewis family

John Lennox Griffith Poyer Lewis (1819-1886) was born in 1819. His father was John Lewis of Henllan in Pembrokeshire and his mother was Eliza Callen sister of Charles Poyer Callen. He was educated at Bromsgrove School and became a barrister. His father died in 1834 and when he came of age he inherited Henllan. In 1857 he married his cousin Katherine Callen but they had no children. In 1874 he commissioned the notable architect John Pollard Seddon to make alterations to the house. This work extended the original Jacobean L-shaped house to provide a large hallway, new staircase, lounge, master bedroom and a library on the first floor landing.

When he died in 1886 his famous brother Bishop Richard Lewis (1821-1905) inherited his estates including the Grove. The properties then descended down the male line until they came to Sir Wilfred Lewis of Henllan who died in 1950.

References

External links
The Grove, Narberth website

Country houses in Pembrokeshire
Grade II listed buildings in Pembrokeshire
Hotels in Pembrokeshire